River East Collegiate is a public high school located in Winnipeg, Manitoba, that belongs to the River East Transcona School Division. River East has a school population of approximately 1,250 students. The school colours are blue and white and the school mascot is the Kodiak bear (Kody).

Programs

Music
River East Collegiate music program is headed by Jeff Kula.

Concert Band

Percussion Ensemble

The River East Collegiate Percussion Ensemble, under the direction of Jeff Kula, rehearses once a week after school, and participation in the ensemble is strictly voluntary. The ensemble performs numerous times throughout the year, and annually does collaborative work with the Brandon University Percussion Ensemble.

Contemporary Music Ensemble

The REC Contemporary Music Ensemble, under the direction of Jeff Kula, performs at one concert at the very end of the school year, performing pieces from such contemporary composers as John Cage and Steve Reich.

Jazz Band

The River East Collegiate Jazz Band (under the direction of Jeff Kula) is an anomaly amongst high school jazz bands. The REC Jazz Band is a no-cut ensemble (except for rhythm section, which is one to a part. However, auxiliary percussion parts are available to those who audition for a rhythm section instrument and don't get the top spot). Roughly 50 students are part of this band, performing pieces by such jazz composers as Duke Ellington, Charles Mingus, and Miles Davis at bi-annual school jazz concerts (which are separate from concert band) and the Brandon Jazz Festival. Throughout the year, students are not forced to play solos, or have tests. However, they are required to fill out eight listening assignments throughout the two semesters. Enrollment in Jazz Band is worth one credit.

Jazz Orchestra

The River East Collegiate Jazz Orchestra, under the direction of Jeff Kula, meets for rehearsal four times a week after school. Unlike the school's Jazz Band, Jazz Orchestra is an auditioned group that is strictly one to a part. The acceptance of the students really only comes down to experience. While the band takes part in numerous festivals every year, the band is best known for its participation in the Essentially Ellington High School Jazz Band Competition and Festival, which takes place each year at Lincoln Center in New York City. The band has been invited to play at the festival five times since 2003 (2003, 2004, 2007, 2008, and 2011). Furthermore, it is the only Canadian band to ever be invited to the festival. The Jazz Orchestra has been invited many times to play before the Winnipeg Jazz Orchestra. This course is worth 1 full credit.

Choir
REC has two audition vocal jazz groups, Vocaleas and Jazzmyn. Jazzmyn is a vocal group that rehearses twice a week. Vocalese also rehearses twice a week but is a program for elite singers only.

In choral, from time to time, guests artists such as Winnipeg Symphony Orchestra have worked with the choral group. Students can audition to be solo. The style of music in choir uses modern and traditional. The choral group also has winter and spring concerts, and also participates in the Winnipeg Music festival.

Grade 10, 11 and 12 choir is called choral. The course is aimed at vocal technique and style for performance. Performance music includes popular and traditional styles. Students must attend all the concerts. Performances include winter and spring concerts and Winnipeg Music festival.

Extracurricular choir programs
There are three choral performing ensembles at River East Collegiate: Vocal Jazz (Jazzmyn), Chamber Choir, and Vocalease.  All courses are run by Ms. Ens. The Vocal Jazz 20G course is worth 1 credit. This course gives gifted and talented vocalists an opportunity to sing advanced four-part music together in a vocal jazz style. Enrollment is limited to 16 students (four students per vocal part). Performances include winter and spring concerts, Choral fest Jazz, and the Brandon Jazz Festival. Students are selected in September by audition only. Vocal Jazz 30S is worth 1 credit and is a continuation of Vocal Jazz 20. Vocal Jazz 40S is worth 1 credit and is a continuation of Vocal Jazz 20G and 30S. The other two courses are Chamber Choir and Vocalease is an audition only group. These courses meet outside of classes to practice for performances. These groups give performances at school concerts as well as the Brandon Jazz Festival.

Drama program
River East is also well known for putting on great annual performances. For the 2010–2011 school year, River east put on a remake of the 1998 musical Footloose, the first musical in fifteen years. Auditions were held in October, and the three performances started 12 April 2011.

Other offered programs

CIP
CIP (Career Internship Program) is a high-school-to-work transition program. Students involved with the program are offered on-the-job experience and classroom study to help them make the post grad transition.  Although students are not paid for their work with cooperating employers, each student earns credit towards their high school diploma.

Peer Tutoring Program
The Peer Tutoring Program is a service "run by the students, for the students." Students with an average of 80% or higher in a course offer their talents by signing up for this program in hopes of helping other students meet their goals. This service is available to all grades for both tutoring and being tutored. Once a tutor and a tutee are matched up they simply choose a specific time to meet and then they are all ready to go. The program is monitored by the River East Collegiate resource teacher. Students who volunteer to be a tutor are awarded by the school at the end of the year.

Sports

River East Collegiate has many teams at both the Junior Varsity and Varsity levels. They have male and female teams in Basketball, Volleyball, Soccer, Golf, Hockey and Indoor/Outdoor Track and Field and a male-only Football team.  They compete in the Kildonan Peguis Athletic Conference (KPAC).  The school football team won the first annual Peguis Bowl in 2007 when they defeated their rival Miles Macdonell Collegiate Buckeyes by a score of 28–0. The school has a tradition of athletic success and hundreds of KPAC championship banners hang in the gym (some dating back to the 1960s).

Varsity Football
River East had previously been in the first division (Potter Division) until 2009 when they moved down to the second division (Vidryk Division); where they made it to a semi-finals with only their second loss and a 7–2 final record with the coaching staff winning the Coaching Staff of the Year in their division. They moved back up to first division the next year later; but after only winning one game that year and losing in the first round of the play-offs they moved back down to the second Division and have remained there in the 2011 & 2012 seasons. In the 2012 season the Kodiaks finished 3rd, being eliminated in the semi-finals by the Kelvin Klippers. They played a good season with a final record of 6 and 3. In 2018 the Kodiaks had another great season finishing the regular season as the first ever Bramwell Conference Champions, and carrying their success into the playoffs to beat out the Kelvin Klippers 22–14 in the finals crowning them CTV Bowl Champions. First year Head Coach Sean Oleksewycz's team finished the season with a record of 9–1, and rings in hand.

Varsity Girls' Volleyball
River East has always had a very strong varsity girls' volleyball team". The season is from September till mid November. They were provincial champions 4 times in a row from 1997 to 2001. Every year they have played very strong against one of the strongest teams which is Lord Selkirk. This year the 2010-11 team was KPAC champions and beat Lord Selkirk in provincial finals.

Junior Varsity Girls' Basketball
River East has a very successful reputation for sports, one of them being basketball. The JV teams participate in KPAC, with the season starting in December, and ending in March. As well with these games, they participate in many tournaments. Throughout the years they have won many KPAC banners and they sometimes participate in the provincials.

In the past, the JV girls' basketball team have won the KPAC conference in these years (There were many back-to-back wins):
1970-71, 1973–74, 1974–75, 1975–76, 1977–78, 1978–79,
1979-80, 1984–85, 1998–99, 1999-00, 2001–02, 2002–03,
2003-04, 2007–08, 2008–09

Girls' hockey
The River east Kodiaks girls' hockey team runs from October till about March. They have a team of 11 players and 1 goalie. They are led by the coaching staff of Mr. Akerstream, Mr. Valiquette, Pat and Karey. Last year the Kodiak girls were placed on the B side, and were in the finals, but lost with only a few seconds left.  It was a close series. This year for season 2012- 2013 the girls were placed on the B side, and so far they are succeeding with wins, and no loses. They continue to succeed throughout the year and hope to win a championship.  The girls work well as a team, never individual play. On the ice the girls all have great chemistry. The new rookies on board this year are doing very well and continue to succeed along with the grade 11's and 12's. In conclusion all the players and coaches get along very well. The grade 12 girls did a very good job of making the rookies feel comfortable around the team. They showed very good leadership.

Boys' hockey
This year the River East Kodiaks boys' hockey team is made up of 15- to 18-year-old boys. The team's record is 3-7 and the team is ranked 9th in the 'A' division. The team will be participating in several tournaments in Winnipeg and late November the team will be visiting Ontario Canada. Also this year we are pleased to be hosting the High School Provincials in our territory. The head coach for the boys' hockey team is Mr.Zajac. The team is made up of several grades – 10, 11 and also 12. This year the boys and coaches are hoping for the best and aiming to win City Champs or Provincials.

Girls' soccer
River East girls' soccer team has been very successful the last 15 years.  The outdoor soccer team has won 9 out of the last 15 KPAC championships. They won in the 1995- 1996 school year, as well as 1997–1998, 2002–2003, 2003–2004, 2005–2006, 2007–2008, 2008–2009 and 2009–2010. The team also won the Manitoba Provincial Championships in 2005 beating Glenlawn in the Finals. The River East soccer team has girls from all 3 grades 10, 11 and 12.  To make the team you to attend the open tryouts before the soccer season, they usually carry a roster anywhere from 14 -18 girls depending on numbers.  Besides just outdoor soccer River East is one of the few schools in the KPAC division to field an indoor team as well.

Junior varsity football
The junior varsity (JV) league was first introduced in 2009 and was made for grade 9 and grade 10 players only. River East joined this league in 2009 and went on to win the championship that same year. The Kodiaks did not have a JV team in the 2010 league due to lack of grade 10 players and loss of coaching staff. The few grade 10 players in 2010 played with the varsity Kodiak football team. In 2011, they once again had enough enrolment to form a team and went on to win the Junior Varsity Division with a school record of 11–0 perfect season with the coaching staff winning the Coaching Staff of the Year in their division.

Notable alumni 
 Chad Posthumus, professional basketball player in the Canadian Elite Basketball League CEBL
 Matt Wiebe, politician and member of the Legislative Assembly of Manitoba

Notes

References

High schools in Winnipeg
Educational institutions established in 1960
1960 establishments in Manitoba